In mathematics, a Sturmian word (Sturmian sequence or billiard sequence), named after Jacques Charles François Sturm, is a certain kind of infinitely long sequence of characters. Such a sequence can be generated by considering a game of English billiards on a square table. The struck ball will successively hit the vertical and horizontal edges labelled 0 and 1 generating a sequence of letters. This sequence is a Sturmian word.

Definition 
Sturmian sequences can be defined strictly in terms of their combinatoric properties or geometrically as cutting sequences for lines of irrational slope or codings for irrational rotations.  They are traditionally taken to be infinite sequences on the alphabet of the two symbols 0 and 1.

Combinatorial definitions

Sequences of low complexity 
For an infinite sequence of symbols w, let σ(n) be the complexity function of w; i.e., σ(n) = the number of distinct  contiguous subwords (factors) in w of length n. Then w is Sturmian if σ(n) = n + 1 for all n.

Balanced sequences 
A set X of binary strings is called balanced if the Hamming weight of elements of X takes at most two distinct values.  That is, for any  |s|1 = k or |s|1 = k where |s|1 is the number of 1s in s.

Let w be an infinite sequence of 0s and 1s and let  denote the set of all length-n subwords of w.  The sequence w is Sturmian if  is balanced for all n and w is not eventually periodic.

 Geometric definitions 

 Cutting sequence of irrational 
Let w be an infinite sequence of 0s and 1s.

 Difference of Beatty sequences 
Let w = (wn) be an infinite sequence of 0s and 1s.

for all  or

for all .

 Coding of irrational rotation 

For  define the θ-coding of x to be the sequence (xn) where

Let w be an infinite sequence of 0s and 1s.

 Discussion 

Example

Balanced aperiodic sequences
A set S of finite binary words is balanced if for each n the subset Sn of words of length n has the property that the Hamming weight of the words in Sn takes at most two distinct values.  A balanced sequence is one for which the set of factors is balanced.  A balanced sequence has at most n+1 distinct factors of length n.  An aperiodic sequence is one which does not consist of a finite sequence followed by a finite cycle.  An aperiodic sequence has at least n + 1 distinct factors of length n.  A sequence is Sturmian if and only if it is balanced and aperiodic.

Slope and intercept
A sequence  over {0,1} is a Sturmian word if and only if there exist two real numbers, the slope  and the intercept , with  irrational, such that

for all . Thus a Sturmian word provides a discretization of the straight line with slope  and intercept ρ.  Without loss of generality, we can always assume , because for any integer k we have

 

All the Sturmian words corresponding to the same slope  have the same set of factors; the word  corresponding to the intercept  is the standard word or characteristic word of slope . Hence, if , the characteristic word  is the first difference of the Beatty sequence corresponding to the irrational number .

The standard word  is also the limit of a sequence of words  defined recursively as follows:

 
 
 
where the product between words is just their concatenation.

The infinite sequence of words  defined by the above recursion is called the standard sequence for the  standard word , and the infinite sequence d = (d1, d2, d3, ...) of nonnegative integers,  with d1 ≥ 0 and dn > 0 (n ≥ 2), is called its directive sequence.

A Sturmian word w over {0,1} is characteristic if and only if both 0w and 1w are Sturmian.

Frequencies
If s is an infinite sequence word and w is a finite word, let μN(w) denote the number of occurrences of w as a factor in the prefix of s of length N + |w| − 1.  If μN(w) has a limit as N→∞, we call this the frequency  of w, denoted by μ(w).

For a Sturmian word s, every finite factor has a frequency.  The three-gap theorem implies that the factors of fixed length n have at most three distinct frequencies, and if there are three values then one is the sum of the other two.

Non-binary words
For words over an alphabet of size k greater than 2, we define a Sturmian word to be one with complexity function n + k − 1.  They can be described in terms of cutting sequences for k-dimensional space.  An alternative definition is as words of minimal complexity subject to not being ultimately periodic.

Associated real numbers
A real number for which the digits with respect to some fixed base form a Sturmian word is a transcendental number.

Sturmian endomorphisms
An endomorphism of the free monoid B∗ on a 2-letter alphabet B is Sturmian if it maps every Sturmian word to a Sturmian word and locally Sturmian''' if it maps some Sturmian word to a Sturmian word.  The Sturmian endomorphisms form a submonoid of the monoid of endomorphisms of B∗.

Define endomorphisms φ and ψ of B∗, where B = {0,1}, by φ(0) = 01, φ(1) = 0 and ψ(0) = 10, ψ(1) = 0.  Then I, φ and ψ are Sturmian, and the Sturmian endomorphisms of B∗ are precisely those endomorphisms in the submonoid of the endomorphism monoid generated by {I,φ,ψ}.

A morphism is Sturmian if and only if the image of the word 10010010100101 is a balanced sequence; that is, for each n, the Hamming weights of the subwords of length n take at most two distinct values.

 History 
Although the study of Sturmian words dates back to Johann III Bernoulli (1772), it was Gustav A. Hedlund and Marston Morse in 1940 who coined the term Sturmian'' to refer to such sequences, in honor of the mathematician Jacques Charles François Sturm due to the relation with the Sturm comparison theorem.

See also 
 Cutting sequence
 Word (group theory)
 Morphic word
 Lyndon word

References

Further reading

 

Combinatorics on words
Sequences and series